The Heritage Hill Historic District is a nationally recognized historic district located north of downtown Burlington, Iowa, United States. It was listed on the National Register of Historic Places in 1982.  The area is primarily a residential neighborhood on the hill north of the central business district. Several churches act as a buffer and provide a transition from the residential area and the commercial areas in the valley. At the time of its nomination there were 141 structures in the district. The breakdown of their uses at that time included: 113 residences, 10 churches or religious use facilities, 7 public or government buildings, and 11 commercial structures. The district also includes North Hill Park, which has been in continuous use since the city was founded in 1836 and is one of the two oldest city parks in Burlington.

Contributing properties
Burlington Public Library
Christ Episcopal Church
First Congregational Church
German Methodist Episcopal Church
St. Paul's Catholic Church
Snake Alley
Snake Alley Historic District

See also 
 National Register of Historic Places listings in Des Moines County, Iowa

References

National Register of Historic Places in Des Moines County, Iowa
Burlington, Iowa
Historic districts on the National Register of Historic Places in Iowa
Historic districts in Des Moines County, Iowa